Inger Helene Nybråten (born 8 December 1960 in Fagernes, Oppland) is a Norwegian former cross-country skier who competed in the 1980s and 1990s.

She won three relay medals at the Winter Olympics with a gold (1984) and two silvers (1992, 1994). Nybråten's biggest successes were at the FIS Nordic World Ski Championships, where she earned one gold (4 × 5 km relay: 1982), one silver (4 × 5 km relay: 1995), and four bronzes (15 km: 1995, 4 × 5 km relay: 1989, 1991, and 1993). She also won six World Cup events from 1984 to 1995.

She represented the club Skrautvål IL, in Skrautvål.

Cross-country skiing results
All results are sourced from the International Ski Federation (FIS).

Olympic Games
 3 medals – (1 gold, 2 silver, 4 bronze)

World Championships
 6 medals – (1 gold, 1 silver, 4 bronze)

World Cup

Season standings

Individual podiums
4 victories  
11 podiums

Team podiums

 10 victories 
 23 podiums

Note:   Until the 1999 World Championships and the 1994 Olympics, World Championship and Olympic races were included in the World Cup scoring system.

References

External links
 

1960 births
Living people
People from Nord-Aurdal
Norwegian female cross-country skiers
Olympic cross-country skiers of Norway
Olympic gold medalists for Norway
Olympic silver medalists for Norway
Cross-country skiers at the 1984 Winter Olympics
Cross-country skiers at the 1988 Winter Olympics
Cross-country skiers at the 1992 Winter Olympics
Cross-country skiers at the 1994 Winter Olympics
Olympic medalists in cross-country skiing
FIS Nordic World Ski Championships medalists in cross-country skiing
Medalists at the 1984 Winter Olympics
Medalists at the 1992 Winter Olympics
Medalists at the 1994 Winter Olympics
Sportspeople from Innlandet